Senator Bonniwell may refer to:

H. H. Bonniwell (1860–1935), Minnesota State Senate
William T. Bonniwell Jr. (1836–1899), Minnesota State Senate